Daniel Auster ( ‎, 7 May 1893 – 15 January 1963) was Mayor of Jerusalem in the final years of Mandatory Palestine, the first Jewish mayor of the city, and the first mayor of Jerusalem after Israeli independence.

Biography
Daniel Auster was born in Kniahynyn, a Galician town that is now a district of the city Ivano-Frankivsk, Ukraine. He immigrated to Ottoman-controlled Palestine prior to World War I after finishing his law studies at the university in Vienna, Austria, from which he graduated in 1914. He initially settled in Haifa and taught German at the Reali School.

He first served at the Austrian expeditionary force headquarters in Damascus, assisting Arthur Ruppin in sending financial help from Constantinople to the starving Yishuv. In 1919, he became Secretary of the Legal Department of the Zionist Commission in Jerusalem. He became Deputy Mayor of Jerusalem under Husayn al-Khalidi in 1936.

In 1937, he became the first Jewish mayor of Jerusalem. He was also a member of the Assembly of Representatives for the General Zionists party and a signatory of the Israeli Declaration of Independence.

In November 1947, he was a member of the Jewish Agency's delegation to the Working Committee of the Trusteeship Council which attempted to draw up a Draft Statute for Jerusalem, but in 1949, he openly declared his opposition to the internationalization of Jerusalem and stated categorically that it was not possible. He contested the 1949 Knesset elections as the leader of the "For Jerusalem" list, but it failed to win a seat.

Awards
Auster was awarded the Order of the British Empire.

References

1893 births
1962 deaths
People from Ivano-Frankivsk
People from the Kingdom of Galicia and Lodomeria
Jews from Galicia (Eastern Europe)
Austro-Hungarian Jews
Ukrainian Jews
Austro-Hungarian emigrants to the Ottoman Empire
Jews in Mandatory Palestine
Israeli people of Ukrainian-Jewish descent
General Zionists politicians
Members of the Assembly of Representatives (Mandatory Palestine)
Deputy Mayors of Jerusalem
Mayors of Jerusalem
Signatories of the Israeli Declaration of Independence
University of Vienna alumni